KLCL (1470 AM) is a radio station licensed to Lake Charles, Louisiana, United States. The station is currently owned by Townsquare Media.  The station's studios are located on North Lakeshore Drive, just northwest of downtown Lake Charles, and its transmitter is located in Westlake, Louisiana. Programming includes: Hugh Hewitt, Brian Kilmeade, Charlie Kirk, Dave Ramsey, Larry Elder, Buck Sexton and Charlie Jones.

History
KLCL signed on the air on May 12, 1935, as KPLC.

References

External links

LCL
Townsquare Media radio stations
Talk radio stations in the United States
Radio stations established in 1935
1935 establishments in Louisiana